Ezekiel Jafary (born 30 December 1989) is a Tanzanian long distance runner who specialises in the marathon. He competed in the marathon event at the 2015 World Championships in Athletics in Beijing, China, placing 27th in 2:23:43. In 2017 he competed in the World Championships marathon held in London, placing 12th with a time of 2:14:05.

References

External links

1989 births
Living people
Tanzanian male long-distance runners
Tanzanian male marathon runners
World Athletics Championships athletes for Tanzania
Place of birth missing (living people)